Albert George Akins (June 13, 1921 – August 29, 1995) was a professional American football halfback and defensive back who played three seasons for the Cleveland Browns, Buffalo Bills and Brooklyn Dodgers in the All-America Football Conference.

Akins was a native of Spokane, Washington and attended Washington State University and later the University of Washington, where he played football and basketball. He was a key member of a University of Washington team that lost the Rose Bowl Game in 1943 to the University of Southern California. Akins played for the Browns in 1946, and subsequently joined Buffalo and Brooklyn. He won an AAFC championship with the Browns, although he did not play in the championship game due to an injury.

After his playing career, Akins became an assistant football coach at Lewis & Clark College in Portland, Oregon. He went on to become head coach of Southern Oregon University for 15 years starting in 1955. His coaching record at Southern Oregon was 71–62–3.

Early life and high school career

Akins grew up in Spokane, Washington and attended John R. Rogers High School, where he played on the basketball team and ran track. His brothers Frank and Hal were also standouts as athletes.

College career

Akins lettered in basketball at Washington State College in 1940 and 1941, but did not play football. By the end of 1943, Akins had transferred to the University of Washington, where many Washington State players went to train in the U.S. Navy. He played football there, starring as a halfback for the Washington Huskies.  He was also said to be a good passer. The 1943 team went undefeated and was heavily favored to beat the University of Southern California in the 1944 Rose Bowl. The USC Trojans won 29–0, however. Akins fumbled the ball in the third quarter, setting up one of the Trojans' touchdowns. Jim Hardy, the USC quarterback, said after the game that the team's "only real fear was that that fellow Al Akins might get loose on the runback of a punt for a touchdown."

Akins also played basketball at the University of Washington in 1944, when he was a first-team All-PCC selection. That year, the Huskies basketball team won 20 games in a row and finished first in their conference.

Professional career

After returning from service in the Pacific in 1946, Akins signed to play for the Cleveland Browns, a team in the new All-America Football Conference (AAFC). He scored his only touchdown of the season on a 50-yard run in a game against the Buffalo Bisons. Cleveland defeated the AAFC's New York Yankees to win the league title that year. Akins, however, did not play in the title game because of an injury. He suffered a separated shoulder in a game against the Miami Seahawks.

Akins played in 1947 for the AAFC's Brooklyn Dodgers. He played for the Buffalo Bills in 1948 when they faced the Browns in the AAFC championship game. Akins sat out because of an injury, and the Browns won the game.

Coaching career

Akins took a job as an assistant coach at Lewis & Clark College in Portland, Oregon. He resigned in 1954 to seek a head coaching job, and got the top spot the following year at Southern Oregon University in Ashland, Oregon. He stayed in that job for 15 seasons until 1969. His teams' combined record was 71–62–3 during that span. He is first all-time among coaches at Southern Oregon in total wins and fifth in career winning percentage (.533).

Head coaching record

References

Bibliography

External links
 

1921 births
1995 deaths
American football defensive backs
American football halfbacks
American men's basketball players
Cleveland Browns (AAFC) players
Lewis & Clark Pioneers football coaches
Southern Oregon Raiders football coaches
Washington State Cougars men's basketball players
Washington Huskies football players
Washington Huskies men's basketball players
Coaches of American football from Washington (state)
Players of American football from Spokane, Washington
Basketball players from Spokane, Washington
American military personnel of World War II